Raffaele Monti (often misspelled Rafaelle or Raffaelle; Milan 1818–1881) was an Italian sculptor, author and poet.

Born in Milan, he studied under his father, the noted sculptor Gaetano Matteo Monti, in the Imperial Academy. At the age of only 20, he was invited to Vienna where he received extensive patronage; he returned to Milan after two years.

In 1846, Monti travelled to England for the year and later settled there. Monti exhibited at the Royal Academy, and soon earned recognition as a leading sculptor with his piece for the 6th Duke of Devonshire, the "Veiled Vestal", a figure with illusionistic veil, a specialism of his. A bust based on this work and cast in Parian porcelain by Copeland, entitled "The Bride" but often known as "The Veiled Bride", was issued in 1861 by the Crystal Palace Art Union. This became one of the most popular Parian busts ever produced.

Monti produced sculptures in marble, but also created in metals and porcelain, while remaining active in the applied arts.

Works
""La Donna Velata" (bust) 1845 Castle of Racconigi
"Veiled Vestal" 1847  Chatsworth House .
"A Circassian Slave in the Market Place at Constantinople" 1850 Wallace Collection.
"Cupid" and "Modesty", a pair, 1853: davidwilsonfineart.com
"Veritas" 1853 Medeiros e Almeida Museum Medeiros de Almeida Foundation, Lisbon, Portugal.
"River Thames" 1854 St John's Lock on the River Thames below Lechlade Originally for the fountains at The Crystal Palace Sydenham
"La Donna Velata" (The Veiled Woman) 1854 Metropolitan Museum of Art
Proscenium Arch 1858 Royal Opera House
"Charles Stewart, 3rd Marquess of Londonderry 1858 Market Place, Durham .
"Veiled Lady" (bust) 1860 Minneapolis Institute of Arts
"The Sleep of Sorrow and the Dream of Joy" 1861 Victoria and Albert Museum
"The Mother" 1871 Potteries Museum & Art Gallery

(Also produced in Parian by Copeland)

"Night" 1862 Parian figure produced by Copeland
"Morning" 1862 Parian figure produced by Copeland

Picture gallery

References

1818 births
1881 deaths
Artists from Milan
Italian emigrants to the United Kingdom
Artists from London
19th-century Italian sculptors
Italian male sculptors
19th-century Italian male artists